From mid-2014 onward, Brazil experienced a severe economic crisis. The country's Gross Domestic Product (GDP) fell by 3.5% in 2015 and 3.3% in 2016, after which a small economic recovery began. That recovery continued until 2020, when the COVID-19 pandemic began to impact the economy again.

The economic crisis occurred alongside a political crisis that resulted in the impeachment of president Dilma Rousseff. These events combined caused mass popular dissatisfaction with the political system.

The cause of the crisis was the aforementioned political crisis, as well as the 2014 commodity price shock, which negatively affected Brazil's exports and reduced the entrance of foreign capital into the economy. However, the most important cause was internal, which is associated with economic measures that didn't achieve the expected results.

During the economic crisis, high unemployment rates were reported throughout the country, and there was widespread uncertainty regarding Brazil's economic future following a series of political scandals. In the first quarter of 2017, Brazil's GDP rose by 1%. This was the first GDP increase to occur in eight consecutive quarters. Finance Minister Henrique Meirelles announced that Brazil had "emerged from the greatest crisis of the century". However, the rise in GDP marked only the end of a technical recession, not the end of the crisis. The recession was the second most severe in the country's history, and was followed by the slowest recovery.

Context

Economic 

Brazil's economy is largely dependent on the export of commodities, particularly iron ore, petroleum and soy. From the late 1990s till 2012, prices for these export commodities rose significantly (partly because of increasing demand from China), resulting in about two decades of economic growth. As a result of the  Great Recession, Brazil's GDP dropped sharply and unemployment rose. During Luiz Inácio Lula da Silva's left-wing presidency from 2003 to 2010, the government redistributed wealth through welfare programs and raised the minimum wage in order to increase consumption.

In response to critics of Lula's socialist economic stance, his successor, Dilma Rousseff (president during the crisis), introduced macroeconomic tax exemptions and subsidies. These policies are widely acknowledged as a major factor in the 2014–16 economic crisis.

Political 
The economic crisis was followed and intensified by a political crisis. In 2014, a series of corruption scandals uncovered by Operation Car Wash engulfed many influential politicians. In the presidential election of the same year, President Dilma Rousseff was re-elected to a second term, defeating the PSDB candidate Aécio Neves by a narrow margin. The result was not recognized by a section of the opposition and provoked popular discontent. Due to the disputed legitimacy of the election, the Operation Car Wash investigation, and the economic crisis; dissatisfaction with the government became widespread. By 2015, Rousseff's approval rating had plummeted to 8% according to a Datafolha survey.

Causes

Slowdown of the Chinese economy and fall in commodity prices
According to Steve Tobin, a researcher at the International Labour Organization (ILO), decreased external demand for Brazilian products, particularly from China, plus the fall in commodity prices, contributed to the crisis. Silvia Matos, a researcher at the Brazilian think-tank and university Getúlio Vargas Foundation, concluded that external factors were responsible for 30% of the crisis. During the downturn, the Brazilian economy exhibited structural weaknesses that had never been seen before, such as low productivity.

Macroeconomic policy errors 

Although decreasing prices for Brazil's exports contributed to the economic crisis, some believe that the primary cause was internal. Gustavo Franco, a right-wing economist who had previously served as president of the Central Bank of Brazil, has asserted that the crisis was entirely self-inflicted by a series of "local macroeconomic measures that went wrong."

Previously, the government had played a major role in the expansion of the internal market by stimulating consumption, raising the national minimum wage, transferring wealth and expanding credit. By the end of Lula's administration, entrepreneurs and industrialists began to question the sustainability of these policies. They complained about the national industry's declining share of Brazilian GDP.

In response to these concerns, Rousseff created the New Economic Matrix in an attempt to help the Brazilian industry become more competitive internationally. These measures included tax exemptions and subsidies which ultimately failed to stimulate industry. Productivity, after growing by 2.7% in 2010, fell by 0.9% and 3.7% in the following two years, shrinking government revenues and thus requiring reductions in public investment.

Political instability 
In the same year the crisis began, a major corruption scheme involving top politicians and major companies such as the oil giant Petrobras was uncovered by Operation Car Wash. It is estimated that Operation Car Wash caused Brazil's GDP to contract by 1 to 1.5%.

Consequences

Unemployment 

Before the recession, Brazil's unemployment rate hovered around 6.8% for most of 2014, but began increasing in February 2015, resulting in a 2015 average of 8.5%. The economy lost more than 1.5 million jobs throughout 2015, fueling public discontent against the political establishment and the political leadership of the Worker's Party and President Dilma Rousseff. The unemployment rate continued to rise throughout 2016 to finish the year at 12.0%, with 12.3 million people unemployed and an estimated 2.8 million private-sector jobs cut over the preceding two years.

Young people were affected most by the worsening job market. While the overall unemployment rate was 12.7% in the first quarter of 2019, the rate in people from 14 to 17 years was 44.5% and 27.3% for people from 18 to 24 years.

Experts expressed concern for the unintended economic and social repercussions for Brazil's younger population, as the economic crisis decreased social security contributions and depreciated human capital (caused by the decrease in the technical capacity of future workers).

Recession 

At the end of the second quarter of 2014, the country was in a technical recession. According to some Brazilian economists, a technical recession is negative economic growth for two consecutive quarters. It is different from an actual recession, in which the situation of the country depreciates significantly. Finance Minister, Guido Mantega, lessened the economic result and, in comparison to Europe, declared that:

Regardless of Mantega's statements, specialists had already spotted signs that a strong recession was well underway, citing the technical recession and later, the small growth of 0.5% at the end of 2014. The expectations were confirmed in the next year when the economy shrunk by 3.5%. In 2016, there was another sharp decrease of 3.3%. In the first trimester of 2017, the GDP rose for the first time after eight consecutive trimesters of negative growth.

The recession caused a fiscal crisis and an increasing budget deficit which, according to Bloomberg, was "the largest-ever primary budget gap ... as a two-year economic recession sapped tax collection while expenses grew further." The government deficit reached 5.8 billion reais (US$1.7 billion) in the first three months of 2016, the widest reported since December 2001. The two-year fiscal deterioration can be explained by the decrease in government revenue from taxes as a result of the recession, while government expenses have been growing constantly.

Increase in economic inequality 

A 2019 study by the Instituto Brasileiro de Economia (IBRE), part of Fundação Getúlio Vargas (FGV), obtained by the magazine Valor Econômico, showed that the Gini coefficient, which measures the economic inequality in society from 0 to 1, had increased year after year since 2015 and reached its peak in March 2019.

In seven years, the accumulated wealth of the top 10% rose by 8.5%, while that of the 40% poorest dropped 14%. The research showed that people with lower incomes suffered the effects of the crisis more intensely and recovered from the crisis slower.

According to an Ibre researcher, Daniel Duque, the recovery of the job market benefited the most qualified and experienced, reinforcing inequality. Many underqualified people gave up trying to get a job, and the loss of hope was at a "[...] record high, and it helps to explain why, even after the decrease in unemployment, inequality kept rising."

Emigration 

The number of declarations of definitive departure from the country began to grow in the first year of crisis and has increased steadily ever since, according to Receita Federal. Among the countries that received the most Brazilian citizens were the United States, Japan and Canada, which, due to low unemployment and aging populations among other reasons, needed a boost to decrease the age of the workforce. Another destination was Portugal, which conceded Portuguese citizenship to 8,000 Brazilians only in 2016, according to Eurostat. Besides the crisis, another reason for the emigration were the elevated levels of criminality.

According to a JBJ Partners employee (a company specialized in expatriation to the United States), many who fled Brazil were qualified workers:

An OECD report shows an even higher number  . In 2016 80,000 Brazilians emigrated legally to one of the member states of the OECD, whereas 99,000 did so in 2017. Similarly, data from Receita Federal shows that the number of people leaving Brazil increased in consecutive years since the beginning of the crisis.

Credit rating 
This is a table of the credit ratings of the Brazilian economy according to Trading Economics.

Anti-crisis measures 

Since the impeachment of Dilma Rousseff and Michel Temer's subsequent rise to power, several measures, most of which are unpopular, were implemented or proposed to get the economy back on track. The most important of which were:

 The  (a.k.a. "new fiscal regime"): Constitutional amendment which established a "ceiling" (upper limit) to government spending for the next 20 years;
 The Outsourcing law, which allows companies to hire outsourced employees to work on primary activities, and not just secondary activities (such as security or cleaning);
 The 2017 labor reform, a significant change in the Consolidation of Labor Laws; and
 a pension reform, which the government failed to approve.

One year after the labor reform was approved, however, it was verified that the decrease in unemployment was minimal, while the contracts of intermittent, outsourced and temporary labor increased.

Recovery 

In early 2017, there were already signals that the economy was beginning to recover, however, it was agreed that the process would be long and slow.

In June 2017, a 1% rise in GDP in the first quarter of the year was reported. It was the first rise of the GDP after eight consecutive falls (two years). Minister of Finance Henrique Meirelles said that the country had left the "greatest recession of the century." However, economists say that the growth characterizes only the end of the "technical recession" and that it is still too early to claim that the crisis is over, given that unemployment remains high and there's still widespread uncertainty regarding the future of the economy, especially in the aftermath of the recent political scandals.

Comparison with other crises 

In countries with similar size and wealth, there were a few, but less severe crises in the same period. In 2015, among OECD countries, only Russia went through a recession. Even after the economic sanctions imposed by other countries due to the conflict in Ukraine, Russia's GDP fell by only 4% in two years (2015 and 2016). Few other countries in this period were going through a recession, which reinforces the argument that the crisis in Brazil was mainly due to local causes.

In comparison to other crises in Brazil, it was verified that the 2014 crisis was not the deepest recession of Brazilian history, as previously thought. After the GDP values for 2015 and 2016 were reviewed by the Brazilian Institute of Geography and Statistics (IBGE), the economy shrank by 8.2% in the period, in contrast to the 8.5% in the 1981 recession. Despite the relative mildness, the crisis was prolonged, being followed by the slowest economic recovery in Brazilian history.

According to Codace (committee part of Fundação Getúlio Vargas), the 1981 crisis lasted nine economic quarters, reached its peak in the first quarter of 1983 and, since then, took seven quarters for the GDP the reach its pre-crisis level. Later, the 1989-1992 crisis lasted 11 quarters and the recovery time was the same: seven quarters. This crisis, however, had a lower intensity, with an accumulated decrease in the GDP of 7.7%.

In turn, Brazil's GDP after the 2014 crisis was expected to reach the pre-crisis level in 2022, according to an optimistic estimate, with 20 quarters of recovery in total. When taking into account both GDP and the employment rate, the recovery from this economic crisis would be measured as taking longer. In addition to the sluggish recovery, the new jobs will likely be of lower quality, including informal and autonomous labor.

See also 
 List of economic crises in Brazil
 Brazil labor reform (2017)
 Economy of Brazil
 2018 in Brazil

References 

2014 in economics
2014 in Brazil
Economic crises in Brazil
Recessions
Government of Michel Temer
Economic history of Brazil